The Selenogyrinae are a subfamily of tarantulas found in Africa and Asia.

Characteristics 
The Selenogyrinae are characterized by a unique stridulating organ situated between the chelicerae, which consists of two very similar rows of hair. In Annandaliella, this is reduced. Some species have labiosternal mounds and the clypeus is usually absent, or very narrow.

Genera 
The WSC currently accepts these genera:
Annandaliella, Hirst 1909 
Euphrictus, Hirst 1908
Selenogyrus, Pocock 1897
Selenogyrus and Euphrictus were the original genera in Hirst's 1908 Selenogyrinae. Annandaliella was added by Schmidt in 1993.

References 

Theraphosidae
Spider subfamilies